Harish Raghavendra (born 7 December  1976) is an Indian Tamil vocalist and actor from Chennai, India. He is the son of photographer P.V Raghavendran. Harish is best known for his songs like Hey Azhagiya Theeyee from Minnale, Nirpadhuve Nadapadhuve from Bharathi, Devathayai Kanden from Kadhal Kondein, Sakkarai Nilave from Youth, Melliname Melliname from Shahjahan and Anbe Enn Anbe from Dhaam Dhoom. He has also acted in a few Tamil movies. He debuted as an actor in Vikadan directed by Arun Pandiyan in which he played the lead role. He also played a brother-role for Ajith Kumar in Thirupathi, which was written and directed by Perarasu.

Career 

Harish officially made his debut into the music industry as a singer at the age of 18. His first song was a Telugu song for the movie Panjaram and he subsequently sung 'Vaa Saghi' for the movie Arasiyal. He was in his final year of college at the time. After that, he was not really active in the music industry. In the meantime, he graduated from Vivekananda College with a degree in commerce and masters in mass communication and journalism. He took up software engineering as well. Software engineering would have been his main career if not for music. Being a police officer was also one of his ambitions when he was studying.

He re-entered the music industry through the well known classical song Nirpadhuve Nadapathuve from the movie Bharathi. The music was composed by Ilaiyaraja. The song became a massive hit back in the year 2000 and it brought him fame along with Tamil Nadu State award. This was the time he changed his name from Harish to Harish Raghavendra, per Ilaiyaraja's recommendation. Before he could even join the software industry, Ye Azhagiye Theeye from Minnale scored a roaring success back to back. Since then, he has sung over 3000 songs in various Indian language movies, predominantly Tamil. He has worked for most of the well known music composers that include Yuvan Shankar Raja, Vidyasagar, G. V. Prakash Kumar, D. Imman, Vijay Antony, Harris Jayaraj & many others. His charming sharp voice has always been a point of attraction for many music directors, so he managed to sing in various languages such as Tamil (his main passion), Telugu, Kannada, Malayalam & Hindi. He has sung some devotional songs as well. After 'Panjaram', he sang for the Telugu film Neetho under Vidyasagar's baton. Since then he has sung many more songs in Telugu, including films like 'Cheli', 'Priyadarshini' and Ghajini.

Harish's latest project include a song about Mahakavi Bharathi – Engal Tamizhe (https://www.youtube.com/watch?v=0PdcG3WTQ94) and the translation, composition and rendition of the Tamil classic Thirukkural (https://www.youtube.com/watch?v=xE1mIRCEgHg)

Having sung many classic hits for the major music directors, Harish is considered to be one of the leading professional singers in Tamil Music Industry. He has also judged many reality shows along with few other famous singers. Harish has also done a number of live concerts in various countries as well. Lately, he also grabbed a Diploma in Yoga in Krishnamacharya style.

His words about Ilayaraja: "Illaiyaraja is a hard taskmaster and a perfectionist. It's really tough singing for him, because he does not let go till he gets the result he wants. It's like a training ground for any singer, and singing for him".

Soundtracks
 Tamil
{|class="wikitable"
! Year 
!Movie!! Song Title !! Music Director !! Co-Singers
|-
| rowspan="1"|1997
!Arasiyal
|"Vaa Sagi Vaa Sagi" ||Vidyasagar || Harish Raghavendra & Uma Ramanan
|-
| rowspan="1"|2000
!Bharathi
|"Nirpathuve Nadapathuve" ||Ilaiyaraaja || Harish Raghavendra 
|-
| rowspan="10"|2001
!Minnale
|"Azhagiya Theeye" ||Harris Jayaraj || Harish Raghavendra 
|-
!Minnale
|"Nenjai Poopol" ||Harris Jayaraj || Harish Raghavendra 
|-
!Dheena
| "En Nenjil" ||Yuvan Shankar Raja|| Harish Raghavendra
|-
!Dum Dum Dum
| "Desingu Raja" ||Karthik Raja || Harish Raghavendra & Sujatha Mohan
|-
!Dum Dum Dum
| "Krishna Krishna" ||Karthik Raja|| Harish Raghavendra & Karthik & Tippu & Febi Mani
|-
!Paarvai Ondre Podhume
| "Thirudiya Idhayathai" ||Bharani|| Harish Raghavendra & K. S. Chithra
|-
!Majunu
| "Mudhal Kanave" ||Harris Jayaraj|| Harish Raghavendra & Bombay Jayashree & O. S. Arun
|-
!Poovellam Un Vasam
| "Chella Nam Veetuku" ||Vidyasagar || Sujatha Mohan & Malaysia Vasudevan & Harish Raghavendra
|-
|-
!12B
| "Poove Vaai Pesum" ||Harris Jayaraj|| Harish Raghavendra & Mahalakshmi Iyer
|-
!Shahjahan
| "Melliname" ||Mani Sharma|| Harish Raghavendra
|-
| rowspan="11"|2002
!April Mathathil
|"Yeh Nenje" ||Yuvan Shankar Raja|| Harish Raghavendra & Sadhana Sargam
|-
!Samurai
|"Aagaya Sooriyanai" ||Harris Jayaraj|| Harish Raghavendra & Harini
|-
!Solla Marandha Kadhai
|"Gundu Malli" ||Ilaiyaraaja|| Harish Raghavendra & Shreya Ghoshal
|-
!Album
|"Kadhal Vanoli" ||Karthik Raja|| Harish Raghavendra & Sujatha
|-
!Thulluvadho Ilamai
|"Kaattrukku Kaattrukku" ||Yuvan Shankar Raja|| Harish Raghavendra & Harini & Febi Mani & Sunder Rajan
|-
!Charlie Chaplin
|"Aval Kanna Paarthaa" ||Bharani|| Harish Raghavendra & S. P. Balasubrahmanyam
|-
!Charlie Chaplin
|"Vaarthai Thavari" ||Bharani|| Harish Raghavendra
|-
!Yai Nee Romba Azhaga Irukey
|"Yamini Yamini" ||Srinivas, Ramesh Vinayakam, Raaghav-Raja, Arvind-Shankar, Murugan|| Harish Raghavendra
|-
!Shree
|"Vasantha Sena Vasantha Sena" || T.S Muralidharan || Harish Raghavendra & K.S. Chitra
|-
!Youth
|"Sakkarai Nilave" || Mani Sharma || Harish Raghavendra
|-
!Run
|"Minsaram En Meedhu" || Vidyasagar  || Harish Raghavendra & Sadhana Sargam & Jack Smelly
|-
| rowspan="11"|2003
!Kadhal Kondein
|"Devadhaiyai Kanden" ||Harris Jayaraj|| Harish Raghavendra
|-
!Winner
|"Engirunthai Naan" ||Yuvan Shankar Raja|| Harish Raghavendra
|-
!Whistle
|"Whistle Adikkum" ||D. Imman|| Harish Raghavendra & Ganga & Anuradha Sriram
|-
!Vikadan
|"Yaarivalo Yaarivalo" ||Jerome Pushparaj|| Harish Raghavendra
|-
!Vikadan
|"Oomai Paadum" ||Jerome Pushparaj|| Harish Raghavendra
|-
!Lesa Lesa
|"Yedho Ondru" ||Harris Jayaraj|| Harish Raghavendra & Srilekha Parthasarathy & Franko
|-
!Kadhal Kondein
|"Thottu Thottu" ||Yuvan Shankar Raja|| Harish Raghavendra
|-
!Kadhal Kondein
|"Devathaiyai Kandaen" ||Yuvan Shankar Raja|| Harish Raghavendra
|-
!Kurumbu
|"Vaa Maasakatre" ||Yuvan Shankar Raja|| Harish Raghavendra & Srinivas & Srilekha Parthasarathy & Subiksha
|-
!Punnagai Poove
|"Vaanam Thoovum Poo" ||Yuvan Shankar Raja|| Harish Raghavendra & Kovai Ranjani
|-
!Kadhal Kirukkan
|"Poove Mudhal Poove" ||Deva|| Harish Raghavendra
|-
| rowspan="6"|2004
!M. Kumaran S/O Mahalakshmi
|"Chennai Senthamizh" ||Srikanth Deva|| Harish Raghavendra
|-
!7G Rainbow Colony
|"Idhu Porkalama" ||Yuvan Shankar Raja|| Harish Raghavendra
|-
!7G Rainbow Colony
|"Kanaa Kaanum Kaalangal" ||Yuvan Shankar Raja|| Harish Raghavendra & Srimathumitha & Ustad Sultan Khan
|-
!Autograph
|"Manasukulle Dhaagam" ||Bharathwaj|| Harish Raghavendra & Reshmi
|-
!Giri
|"Kishu Kishu Manusha" ||D. Imman|| Harish Raghavendra & Mathangi
|-
!Arasatchi
|"Oh Muhalai Muhalai" ||Harris Jayaraj|| Harish Raghavendra & Harini
|-
| rowspan="6"|2005
!Devathaiyai Kanden
|"Azhage Brammanidam" ||Deva|| Harish Raghavendra
|-
!Anbe Vaa
|"Kaal Koluse" ||D. Imman|| Harish Raghavendra & Balram
|-
!Oru Kalluriyin Kathai
|"Kadhal Enbadhu" ||Yuvan Shankar Raja|| Harish Raghavendra & Chinmayi
|-
!Jithan
|"Kadhaliye" ||Srikanth Deva|| Harish Raghavendra
|-
!Thirupachi
|"Kannum Kannumthaan" ||Mani Sharma|| Harish Raghavendra & Uma Ramanan & Premji Amaren
|-
!Karka Kasadara
|"Noothanaa Nee" ||Prayog|| Harish Raghavendra & Chinmayi
|-
| rowspan="3"|2006
!Thirupathi
|"Sollavum Mudiyala" ||Bharathwaj|| Harish Raghavendra & Swarnalatha
|-
!Kodambakkam
|"Ragasiyamanathu" ||Sirpy|| Harish Raghavendra & Harini
|-
!Thiruvilaiyaadal Aarambam
|"Vizhigalil Vizhigalil" ||D. Imman|| Harish Raghavendra
|-
| rowspan="2"|2008
!Dhaam Dhoom
|"Anbe En Anbe" ||Harris Jayaraj|| Harish Raghavendra
|-
!Kadhalil Vizhunthen
|"Thozhiya En Kadhaliya" ||Vijay Antony|| Harish Raghavendra & Sri Charan & Vijay Antony
|-
| rowspan="2"|2009
!Ayan
|"Nenje Nenje" ||Harris Jayaraj|| Harish Raghavendra & Mahathi
|-
!Renigunta
|"Mazhai Peyyum" ||Ganesh Raghavendra|| Harish Raghavendra 
|-
| rowspan="1"|2010
!Kalavani
|"Oru Murai Iru Murai" ||S. S. Kumaran|| Harish Raghavendra & Srimathumitha
|-
| rowspan="4"|2011
!Mambattiyan
|"Chinna Ponnu Selai" ||S. Thaman|| Harish Raghavendra & Shaila & Sanjeev Kumar
|-
!Mayakkam Enna
|"Ennenna Seidhom" ||G. V. Prakash Kumar|| Harish Raghavendra
|-
!Engeyum Kadhal
|"Nenjil Nenjil" ||Harris Jayaraj|| Harish Raghavendra & Chinmayi
|-
!Padam Parthu Kadhai Sol
|"Ival Yaaro" ||Ganesh Raghavendra|| Harish Raghavendra & Chinmayi 
|-
| rowspan="1"|2012
!Neerparavai
|"Raththa Kannee" ||N. R. Raghunanthan|| Harish Raghavendra
|-
| rowspan="2"|2013
!Mathapoo
|"Adada Idhayam Parakiradhe" ||Velayudham|| Harish Raghavendra
|-
!Mathil Mel Poonai
|"Oru Poo Pookiradhu" ||Ganesh Raghavendra|| Harish Raghavendra & Harini
|-
| rowspan="2"|2014
!Idhu Kathirvelan Kadhal
|"Anbe Anbe" ||Harris Jayaraj|| Harish Raghavendra & Harini
|-
!Hogenakkal
|"Poove Poove" ||G. V. Prakash Kumar|| Harish Raghavendra & Nimmi
|-
| rowspan="1"|2015
!Muthu Nagaram
|"Onnapathi Yaar" ||Jayaprakash|| Harish Raghavendra
|-
| rowspan="1"|2017
!Singam 3
|"Mudhal Murai" ||Harris Jayaraj|| Harish Raghavendra & Swetha Mohan & Ramya NSK & Karthik
|-
| rowspan="1"|2019
!Vilambaram
|"Azhagazhagai" ||J. Vimal Raj|| Harish Raghavendra
|-
| rowspan="1"|2020
!Onbathu Kuzhi Sampath
|"Ennenna Idhayathile" ||Va Charlie|| Harish Raghavendra
|-
Harish Raghavendra released a single "Engal Tamizhe" in 2009.
Harish Raghavendra & Vijayalashmi sang "Mudhal Kadhal " in 2014. This is from Mudhal Kadhal which is a Tamil Pop album.
Harish Raghavendra sang "Thirukkural"
|-
|}

 Acting career All films are in Tamil, unless otherwise noted.''

References

External links 

More info about Harish Raghavendra Soundtracks

Tamil playback singers
Tamil male actors
Living people
Kannada playback singers
Indian Tamil people
Tamil Nadu State Film Awards winners
People from Coimbatore
Indian male playback singers
1976 births